Elizabeth Guard (3 December 1814 – 16 July 1870) was an Australian settler of New Zealand. She was born in Parramatta, New South Wales, Australia on 3 December 1814.

In 1830, she married the former Australian convict Jacky Guard and settled in his Whale hunting station on New Zealand. She was the first white woman in the southern island of New Zealand and gave birth to the first white child, her son John, in 1831, and was is as such counted as a colonial pioneer. During a trip to Australia in 1834, the ship sank outside the North Island of New Zealand and she and her children was taken hostage by the Maori, while her spouse was allowed to return to Australia for a ransom. This case became a case celebre in contemporary press. During her time with the maori, she married the chief Oaoiti and was relatively well treated, though sensationalist stories claimed that she was taken naked away into captivity. Her spouse returned a couple of months later with a British regiment who slaughtered the maori brutally. She returned to New Zealand with her spouse in 1836.

References

1814 births
1870 deaths
People from Parramatta
Australian emigrants to New Zealand
19th-century New Zealand people